Warship is a British documentary series produced by Channel 5 about the Royal Navy. The series features two Navy ships and documents the daily routines of the crew on board during a deployment or exercise. The first series focused on the lives of the crew on board the aircraft carrier . The second series was filmed on the amphibious warfare ships  and  during a six-month exercise in 2009.

Episodes
Twelve episodes of the series aired:

Series 1 (2010)

Series 2 (2010)

References

External links
HMS Bulwark – Royal Navy official website

2010 British television series debuts
2010 British television series endings
2010s British documentary television series
2010s British television miniseries
Channel 5 (British TV channel) original programming
British military television series
English-language television shows